This is a list of Egyptian Navy ships including all ships of the Egyptian Navy as well as its predecessors.

The Egyptian Navy is the largest navy in the Middle East and Africa. Since 2013, the Egyptian Navy made a modernization project in which new vessels were acquired from western sources such as the United States, Germany, Italy and France.

Current and future ships

Egyptian Coast Guard
The Egyptian Coast Guard is responsible for the onshore protection of public installations near the coast and the patrol of coastal waters to prevent smuggling.

Patrol boats
 22 Timsah I/II class
 12 Sea Spectre PB Mk III class
 9 Swiftships class
 6 MV70 class
 5 P-6 (Project 183) class
 3 Textron class

Patrol crafts
 25 Swiftships 26m class
 16 SR.N6 class
 9 Type 83 class
 6 Crestitalia class
 12 Spectre class
 12 Peterson class
 5 Nisr class
 29 DC-30 class
 3 of 6 MRTP-20 Yonka Onuk MRTP-20 class

See also
List of ships of the line of Egypt
List of Egyptian sail frigates

References

External links
 https://books.google.ae/books?id=TJunjRvplU4C&pg=PA173&lpg=PA173&dq=st802+radar&source=bl&ots=wLqYoqf53D&sig=DCinOyD0UJem3CMtDxUJJTbUIGA&hl=en&sa=X&ei=CdpEUvOTDITWtQbxi4HoBw&sqi=2#v=onepage&q&f=false
 https://books.google.ae/books?id=TEmPseAGX_sC&lpg=PA140&ots=8xxFxn7mnf&dq=Toplivo+II+class+tanker&pg=PA140&hl=en#v=onepage&q=Toplivo%20II%20class%20tanker&f=false
 https://web.archive.org/web/20160304093053/http://119.63.205.89/~baird/index.php?option=com_content&view=article&id=262%3Aswiftships-to-build-25-fast-patrol-craft-for-egyptian-navy&catid=73&Itemid=65
 http://www.thebahrainconspiracy.com/the-military-ships.php
 http://www.nti.org/analysis/articles/netherlands-submarine-import-and-export-behavior/
 
 http://www.hazegray.org/worldnav/africa/egypt.htm#2
 http://www.globalsecurity.org/military/world/egypt/navy-equipment.htm
 http://combatfleetoftheworld.blogspot.com/
 http://wiki.baloogancampaign.com/index.php/DataShip?DB=DB3000

Naval ships of Egypt
Egypt